The 2007–08 Western Kentucky Hilltoppers men's basketball team represented Western Kentucky University during the 2007–08 NCAA Division I men's basketball season. The Hilltoppers were led by head coach Darrin Horn and by future NBA player Courtney Lee. They were members of the East Division of the Sun Belt Conference and finished the season 29–7 with a 16–2 record in Sun Belt play to finish tied for first in the East Division.  The team won the Sun Belt Basketball tournament and earned the conference's automatic bid to the NCAA tournament, where they advanced to the Sweet Sixteen.  Western Kentucky finished ranked 22nd in the postseason ESPN/USA Today Poll.
Lee was SBC Player of the year and was joined by Tyrone Brazelton on the All SBC team.  Jeremy Evans was SBC Tournament Most Valuable Player, Lee and Brazelton also made the All-Tournament team.  Brazelton was named to the NCAA Tournament All-Region Team.

Schedule

|-
!colspan=6| Regular season
 
|-

|-
!colspan=6| 2008 Sun Belt Conference men's basketball tournament

|-
!colspan=6| 2008 NCAA Division I men's basketball tournament

References

Western Kentucky Hilltoppers basketball seasons
WKU
WKU